Lanjabad or Lenjabad may refer to:
Lanjabad, Ardabil
Lenjabad, Marivan, Kurdistan Province
Lenjabad, Sanandaj, Kurdistan Province
Lanjabad, Lorestan